Black Lightning is an extant 1924 American silent drama film directed by James P. Hogan and starring Thunder the Marvel Dog "supported" by Clara Bow and other "All Star Cast". The feature was produced by Gotham Pictures Company.

Plot
As described in a review in a film magazine, with the murder of Frank Larned (Hogan), his sister Martha (Bow) and her little brother were left unprotected and the object of unwelcome attentions from Jim Howard (Mason) and his half-witted brother. Roy Chambers (Austin), who was gassed in France during World War I, is ordered by the doctor to go to the mountains. Chance brings him with a police dog he has picked up to the Larned home. He finds that Martha is the sister of his buddy in France, who saved his life, and Thunder being the dog that came to his rescue. Learning the situation, he decides to stay awhile. Joe gets hurt and Roy rides for a doctor. Ez (Phillips), the half-witted chap, shoots him. Martha sends Thunder to find him, Jim comes and tries to get into the Larned home. Ez kills him and then attacks Martha. Thunder comes to her rescue. Martha and Roy then journey to the preacher together.

Cast

Preservation
Prints of Black Lightning are preserved at the Russian state film archive Gosfilmofond and in California at the UCLA Film and Television Archive.

References

External links

Lobby poster

1924 films
American silent feature films
Films directed by James Patrick Hogan
Silent American drama films
American black-and-white films
1924 drama films
Gotham Pictures films
1920s American films